Yunnan Chihong Zinc and Germanium Company Limited is the state-owned enterprise engaged in the processing, extracting and prospecting and trading of zinc, lead, germanium and sulphuric acid products.

The company was founded in Qujing, Yunnan, China in 2000. It was listed on the Shanghai Stock Exchange in 2004.

In 2010, Chihong's Canadian subsidiary, Chihong Canada Mining, closed a joint venture with Selwyn Resources Ltd. for the development of a zinc-lead mining operation in the Yukon. The transaction cost CDN$100 million to complete.

References

External links
Yunnan Chihong Zinc and Germanium Company Limited

Chinese companies established in 2000
Government-owned companies of China
Companies based in Yunnan
Metal companies of China
Non-renewable resource companies established in 2000
Qujing
2000 establishments in China